Lyman, formerly Krasnyi Lyman ('Red Lyman') from 1925 to 2016, is a city in the Donetsk region of Ukraine. Administratively, it is incorporated as a city of oblast significance. Until 2016, it also served as the administrative center of Lyman Raion, though it was not a part of the raion. It still serves as the center of Lyman hromada. The population was  down from 28,172 in 2001. In October 2022, following the two Battles of Lyman of the 2022 Russian Invasion of Ukraine, the population was estimated to be approximately 5,000.

History
Archaeologists have discovered Neolithic stone sculptures in the Lyman district and Scythian remains from the fourth and third centuries BCE. According to the Russian language Entsiklopedicheskii slovar (vol 34, page 687) in the seventeenth century, a fort was built there to defend the southern borders of Sloboda Ukraine from the attacks of the Crimean Tatars. It is first mentioned in documents of the mid-1600s. In the course of the administrative reform carried out in 1708 by Moscow tsar Peter I, Lyman was explicitly mentioned as one of the towns included to Azov Governorate. The town was given the prefix Krasnyi (Red) in 1925 for ideological purposes by the Soviet regime.

Russo-Ukrainian War 
In June 2014, the city was the scene of the battle of Krasnyi Lyman during the War in Donbas. On 5 June the town returned to Ukrainian control.

Following the 2015 law on decommunization the city returned to its original name Lyman, removing the prefix Krasnyi. The change was approved by the Verkhovna Rada (the Ukrainian parliament) on 4 February 2016.

Lyman is an important railway junction. During the 2022 Russian invasion of Ukraine, Lyman was seized following a battle for the city by Russian troops on 27 May. Russian occupiers changed the city's name back to Soviet Krasnyi Liman shortly thereafter. From 10 September, Ukrainian troops advanced to Lyman as part of the Ukrainian Kharkiv counteroffensive, and engaged Russian troops in what has been called the Second Battle of Lyman. On 1 October, a Russian Defense Ministry spokesman announced that Russian and allied forces were withdrawing from the city, hours after Russian president Vladimir Putin had declared the city annexed by Russia.

Industry 

Lyman is an important railway junction, carrying up to 30% of cargo on the Donetsk railway system. 35% of residents are employed in rail transport, and 18% in industry. Railway transport enterprises include the local office of the Donetsk Railway Administration, the PMS-10 track engine station, the ТЧ-1 locomotive depot, the РПЧ-3 motor car depot, and numerous maintenance sites and sections of the railway. Other industries include food processing, a feed mill, quarry management, the Leman-Beton concrete manufacturer, and others. 

More than 80 agricultural enterprises operate in the region. The forestry and animal husbandry business is among the most important in Ukraine. More than 40,000 mink skins are produced in Lyman annually. There is also a branch of the energy company 000 Donbasnefteprodukt. Other industries have included a silicate brick factory, an asphalt and concrete factory, and a food canning factory.

Demographics
As of the 2001 Ukrainian census:

Ethnicity
 Ukrainians: 84.4%
 Russians: 13.8%
 Belarusians: 0.6%

Twin towns
On 11 January 2023, Westport, Connecticut officially announced Lyman as their sister city.

References

External links
 Krasnyi Lyman Promo Video (May 2012)

 
Cities in Donetsk Oblast
Destroyed cities
Izyumsky Uyezd
Cities of regional significance in Ukraine
City name changes in Ukraine
Former Soviet toponymy in Ukraine
Populated places established in the 17th century
Kramatorsk Raion